Yuan Liang (1882–1953) was a Kuomintang politician of the Republic of China. He was born in Hangzhou, Zhejiang. He was the 21st mayor of Beijing.

References

Bibliography

 
 何立波「『華北自治運動』中的冀東偽政権」『二十一世紀』網絡版総第49期、2006年4月
 
 「江西九江一市民将斯諾饋贈的槍支上交警方」 中国網、2001年6月26日
 

1882 births
1953 deaths
Politicians from Hangzhou
Members of the Kuomintang
Mayors of Beijing
Republic of China politicians from Zhejiang